Annual mallow is a common name for several plants and may refer to:
 Lavatera trimestris
 Malope trifida